Jean Thesman (1929–2016) was a popular and award-winning novelist for young adults whose predominant theme was the heroine finding her place in the world by coming to understand her family. "I loved telling the story, because I really believed that families were made up of the people you wanted, not the people you were stuck with." —Emily Shepherd

Biography 
"My mother taught me to read before I started school, but I had to wait to be six before I could have a library card."

"In 25 years, I wrote 40 books. Most of them came out under my own name, but a few were published under the name T.J. Bradstreet."

She lived in Washington state, and was a member of The Authors Guild and the Society for Children's Book Writers and Illustrators.

Jean Thesman died January 21, 2016, at age 86 after a short illness.

Works 
1984 New Kid In Town
1985 A Secret Love
1985 Two Letters for Jenny
1987 The Last April Dancers
1987 Running Scared
1988 Appointment with a Stranger
1988 Was It Something I Said?
1989 Couldn't I Start Over?
1990 Rachel Chance
1991 The Rain Catchers
1991 Who Said Life Is Fair?
1992 When The Road Ends
1993 Molly Donnelly
1994 Cattail Moon
1994 Nothing Grows Here
1995 A Night to Remember (contribution)
1995 Summerspell
1996 The Ornament Tree
1997 Be Mine (contribution)
1997 The Storyteller's Daughter
1998 The Moonstones
1999 The Other Ones
1999 The Tree of Bells
2000 Calling The Swan
2001 In The House Of The Queen's Beasts
2001 A Sea So Far
2002 Between
2003 Rising Tide
2005 Singer

The Whitney Cousins series

1990 Amelia
1990 Erin
1990 Heather
1992 Triple Trouble

The Birthday Girls series

1992 I'm Not Telling
1992 Mirror, Mirror
1992 Who Am I, Anyway?

The Elliott Cousins series

1998 Jamie
1998 Meredith
1998 Teresa

As T.J. Bradstreet

1995 Kitty's Wish
1996 Lorna's Wish
1996 Wendy's Wish
1997 Before She Wakes

References

External links
 
 
 T. J. Bradstreet at LC Authorities, with 3 records

20th-century American novelists
21st-century American novelists
American children's writers
Writers from Seattle
1929 births
2016 deaths
American women novelists
American women children's writers
20th-century American women writers
21st-century American women writers
Novelists from Washington (state)